Delia Parr is a pen name for the historical fiction author Mary Lechleidner.

Raised in Pennsauken Township, New Jersey, Parr attended Pennsauken High School and graduated from Rutgers University. She is a retired high school teacher who writes whenever possible. She is a mother of three grown children and now lives on Florida's Gulf Coast.

Books

Candlewood Trilogy
 A Hearth in Candlewood (2006)
 Refining Emma (June 1, 2007)
 Where Love Dwells (2008)

Home Ties Trilogy  
 Day By Day (June 1, 2007)
  Abide With Me (2005)
  Carry The Light (2006)

Trinity Series
 A Place Called Trinity (2003)
 Home to Trinity (2003)
  The Midwife's Choice (Not yet on shelves)

Other Titles
Evergreen (1995)
The Fire in Autumn (1996)
By Fate's Design (1996)
The Ivory Duchess (1997)
The Minister's Wife (1998)
Sunrise (1999)
Perfect Secrets (1999) by Delia Parr, Kathleen Kane, Judith O'Brien, and Brenda Joyce
The Promise of Flowers (2000)

References

External links
Mary Lechleidner's Personal Website

Living people
American historical novelists
Pennsauken High School alumni
People from Collingswood, New Jersey
People from Pennsauken Township, New Jersey
Rutgers University alumni
Year of birth missing (living people)